is a 1984 Japanese musical drama film directed by Kinji Fukasaku, adopted from the 1979 musical with the same name.

It received multiple nominations at the 8th Japan Academy Film Prize, including Director of the Year and Outstanding Performance by an Actress in a Leading Role (Keiko Matsuzaka).

Cast 
Keiko Matsuzaka as Madoka Hatano
Morio Kazama as Shiro Hatano
Etsuko Shihomi as Lily
Ryudo Uzaki as Bakumatsu
Mitsuru Hirata as Shinzo Hirota
Noboru Mitani as Ho-san
Isao Natsuyagi as Shirai

Other credits 
Writing:
Kinji Fukasaku
Ren Saito: story
Yôzô Tanaka
Art Direction:
Kyohei Morita
Yutaka Yokoyama
Assistant Director: Hideo Nanbu
Sound recordist: Kazuhisa Takahashi

References

External links 
 

1984 films
1980s musical drama films
1984 drama films
Films directed by Kinji Fukasaku
Films set in Shanghai
Japanese musical drama films
1980s Japanese films